The University of Leeds Boat Club (UoLBC) is the rowing club for students at the University of Leeds, West Yorkshire, England. The boat club is one of the Leeds Gryphons teams, working to develop top-class sports clubs at the University. The club races in green, burgundy and white colours representing those of the University of Leeds.

History
The club was founded in 1919. Having occupied a variety of buildings throughout the area, the current water base is located in Leeds following the completion of a new boat house which opened in September 2014 next to Thwaite Mills in Stourton. It is the new home of Leeds University Boat Club and Leeds Rowing Club. Land training takes place in Leeds University's sport complex on the main campus in Leeds.

The club owns and maintains a variety of different rowing and sculling boats of different classes. In 2008 a Hudson Shark 8+ was donated to the club by the father of a student in the 1st VIII. The boat was named Dr. Sue Jacklin, in recognition of her ongoing assistance in securing funding for the club.

Racing
The club competes at local and national events  and has had a number of notable achievements  from competing at BUCS, Head of The River and Henley Royal Regatta – reaching the second round of the Temple Challenge Cup in 2004 and 2007.

Results
BUCS Regatta 2019:
 Silver, Men's Championship 1x, Leeds (Brigham)
 Silver, Women's Beginner 4x, Leeds

Head of the River Race 2019:
 56th place, Leeds University 'A'
 179th place, Leeds University 'B'
 176th place, Leeds University 'C'

Women's Eights Head of the River Race 2018:
 85th place, Leeds University 'A'
 218th place, Leeds University 'C'
 221st place, Leeds University 'B'

Head of the River Race 2018:
 81st place, Leeds University 'A'
 256th place, Leeds University 'B'

Women's Eights Head of the River Race 2017:
 130th place, Leeds University 'A'
 267th place, Leeds University 'B'

Women's Eights Head of the River Race 2016:
 89th place, Leeds University 'A'
 273rd place, Leeds University 'B'

Head of the River Race 2016:
 203rd place, Leeds University I
 299th place, Leeds University II

Head of the River Race 2015:
 140th place, Leeds University I
 306th place, Leeds University II

Women's Eights Head of the River Race 2013:
 145th place, Leeds University

Head of the River Race 2012:
 114th place, Leeds University I, 00:19:24.90
 181st place, Leeds University II, 00:19:51.88

Women's Eights Head of the River Race 2012:
 110th place, Leeds University A, 00:22:42.57
 271st place, Leeds University B, 00:25:38.58

BUCS Regatta 2012:
 0 gold, 0 silver, 1 bronze
 36 VL points

British and European Indoor Rowing Championship
 1st – Women's Lwt – Emily Holt, 7:29.8

Committee
The club is run entirely by a student based committee which is elected by its members in March/April each year. A small budget allows for the assistance of one paid coach.

Alumni
The club holds events at The Boat Race and Henley Royal Regatta to keep up their links with previous members. Alumni regattas are held  annually in Leeds.

See also
University rowing (UK)

References

External links
 Leeds University Union Boat Club Facebook page
 Leeds University Union Rowing site

Clubs and societies of the University of Leeds
Sports clubs established in 1919
Rowing clubs in England
University and college rowing clubs in the United Kingdom